ISRIB (integrated stress response inhibitor) is an experimental drug that reverses the effects of eIF2α phosphorylation with an IC50 of 5 nM. It was discovered in the laboratory of Peter Walter at University of California, San Francisco (UCSF) through a semi-automated screening of a large library of small molecules by Carmela Sidrauski, who decided to pursue research on it. It has been shown to inhibit eIF2α phosphorylation-induced stress granule (SG) formation. Since eIF2α phosphorylation is known to be involved in memory formation, ISRIB was tested to see whether it would be active in vivo, and was found to readily cross the blood–brain barrier, with a half-life of eight hours. 

Subsequent testing in 2013 found ISRIB to produce significant nootropic effects in mice, as measured by enhancement of spatial and fear-associated learning in standard water-maze and conditioned environment tests. 

The technology was licensed to Calico in 2015 and Sidrauski was hired to help find possible drugs based on ISRIB. She heads the laboratory in which it is being studied. 

Testing in 2017 indicated the experimental drug improved the ability of brain-injured mice to learn and form memories on memory tests, thus appearing to reverse impairments from traumatic brain injury. ISRIB treatment also corrects spatial memory deficits and improves working memory in aged mice.

Further research on the drug by Sidrauski has shown that the molecule restored memory formation in mice months after traumatic brain injuries. It also has shown potential in treating neurodegenerative diseases such as Alzheimer’s, Parkinson’s, and Lou Gehrig’s disease (also known as amyotrophic lateral sclerosis, or ALS). In mice, it has reduced age-related cognitive decline and given healthy mice improved memory. Research on ISRIB by Sidrauski continues at Calico.

See also 

 Meclofenoxate
 Salubrinal

References

External links 
 DEC 1, 2020:Drug reverses age-related cognitive decline within days, by University of California, San Francisco 

Chloroarenes
Cyclohexanes
Carboxamides